Neset Fotballklubb is a Norwegian association football club located in Frosta, Trøndelag. The club was founded 1 June 1905 as Trygg. The men's team currently plays in 5. divisjon, the sixth tier of the Norwegian football league system. Neset play their home games at Vinnatrøa kunstgress.

History
The club was founded as Trygg on 1 June 1905. In 1914, they changed name to Neset Fotballklubb as they became part of Nordenfjeldske Fotballkrets. They played their first game in the summer of 1905, although the team did not have kits, but played with knit caps in the club's colours.

The club participated in the inaugural season of the national league top division; the 1937–38 Norgesserien. They won their district group containing teams from Trøndelag, and qualified for the championship play-offs. They were eliminated by Kristiansund after a 7–2 loss on aggregate in the quarter-finals. Neset reached the fourth round of the Norwegian Cup in 1938, where they ere eliminated by Odd after a 2–0 defeat. In 1940, the club made their best ever performance in the Norwegian Cup as they reached the fifth round, where they ere eliminated by Sarpsborg after a 3–1 defeat. In the 1947–48 Norgesserien, the first post-war league season, Neset were among the 58 teams that relegated from the top division due to restructuring of the league system. They have not played on the top level since.

Neset played in the 2015 3. divisjon, but was relegated two consecutive times, first to the 4. divisjon and then to the 2017 5. divisjon. They promoted to the 2018 4. divisjon, but was relegated the following season; their third relegation in four seasons.

Recent seasons
{|class="wikitable"
|-bgcolor="#efefef"
! Season
!
! Pos.
! Pl.
! W
! D
! L
! GS
! GA
! P
!Cup
!Notes
|-
|2015
|3. divisjon (Trøndelag)
|align=right bgcolor="#FFCCCC"| 12
|align=right|26||align=right|7||align=right|2||align=right|17
|align=right|43||align=right|86||align=right|23
|First round
|Relegated to 4. divisjon
|-
|2016
|4. divisjon (Trøndelag)
|align=right bgcolor="#FFCCCC"| 6
|align=right|22||align=right|10||align=right|7||align=right|5
|align=right|61||align=right|49||align=right|37
|First qualifying round
|Relegated to 5. divisjon due torestructuring of the league system
|-
|2017
|5. divisjon (Trøndelag)
|align=right bgcolor=#DDFFDD| 1
|align=right|18||align=right|15||align=right|1||align=right|2
|align=right|66||align=right|20||align=right|46
|
|Promoted to 4. divisjon
|-
|2018
|4. divisjon (Trøndelag)
|align=right bgcolor="#FFCCCC"| 11
|align=right|22||align=right|5||align=right|1||align=right|16
|align=right|17||align=right|68||align=right|16
|dnq
|Relegated to 5. divisjon
|-
|2019
|5. divisjon (Trøndelag)
|align=right| 7
|align=right|18||align=right|8||align=right|2||align=right|8
|align=right|29||align=right|45||align=right|26
|dnq
|
|}

References

Football clubs in Norway
Sport in Trøndelag
Association football clubs established in 1905
1905 establishments in Norway
Frosta